The Flying Lizards were an experimental English new wave band, formed in 1976. They are best known for their eccentric cover version of Barrett Strong's "Money", featuring Deborah Evans-Stickland on lead vocals, which reached the UK and US record charts in 1979. They followed this with their self-titled album that year, which reached number 60 on the UK Albums Chart.

Career
Formed and led by record producer David Cunningham, the group were a loose collective of avant-garde and free-improvising musicians, including David Toop and Steve Beresford as instrumentalists, with Deborah Evans-Stickland, Patti Palladin and Vivien Goldman as main vocalists.

In August 1979 the Flying Lizards appeared twice on the BBC's Top of the Pops performing their hit single "Money (That's What I Want)". They also appeared in February 1980, performing follow-up single "TV". Virgin Records extended the band's recording contract after the success of "Money". The group released their début album The Flying Lizards in 1979. The album included two songs – "Her Story" and "The Window" – written and sung by Goldman. Their single issues included their postmodern cover versions of songs such as Eddie Cochran's "Summertime Blues" and "Money".

The 1981 album Fourth Wall received praise from critics but did not sell well. Top Ten (1984), with vocalist Sally Peterson, released by Statik records, consisted entirely of covers, done in a similarly deliberately emotionless, and robotic style, (described by the NME at the time as "Sloane Rap"), including two singles, James Brown's "Sex Machine" and "Dizzy, Miss Lizzy", as well as an album track of Leonard Cohen's "Suzanne". Cunningham and Peterson worked together on music production for film and advertising after Top Ten was released, including a re-recording of "Money".

The Flying Lizards version of Barrett Strong's "Money" remained popular, and was used in the film soundtracks for The Wedding Singer, Empire Records, Charlie's Angels and Lord of War, as well as in the Emmy and Golden Globe award-winning American television medical drama Nip/Tuck, documentary series People's Century, and in Ashes to Ashes, the follow-up to the UK TV drama Life on Mars. It was also used in the episode "Venus Rising" of WKRP in Cincinnati, the episode "Follow the Money" of "Family Guy", and in a commercial for Taco Bell in 2011.

An album of dub instrumentals, The Secret Dub Life of the Flying Lizards, recorded by David Cunningham mostly in 1978, was finally released in 1995. The first two albums, The Flying Lizards and Fourth Wall, were re-released by RPM in 2010, with the catalogue number RETROD883.

"Money" reached the UK top 40, and was the band's only single to do so.

Band members
 David Toop
 Steve Beresford
 Michael Upton
 Julian Marshall
 Michael Nyman
 David Cunningham
 Vivien Goldman
 Robert Fripp
 Bob Black
 Deborah Evans-Stickland
 Patti Palladin
 Peter Laurence Gordon
 Sally Peterson
 Rory Allam

Discography

Albums

Singles

See also
 List of new wave artists and bands
 List of performers on Top of the Pops
 List of post-punk bands

References

External links
 David Cunningham website
 The Secret Dub Life of The Flying Lizards
 The Flying Lizards biography
 RPM Records
 
 
 Staubgold
 TRY Mini

English post-punk music groups
English new wave musical groups
Musical groups established in 1978
Musical groups disestablished in 1984